Joseph Wolff is a Luxembourg philatelist who was appointed to the Roll of Distinguished Philatelists in 2003. He is a specialist in the philately of Luxembourg under German occupation and telecommunications on stamps. He has been president of the Fédération Internationale de Philatélie.

References

Signatories to the Roll of Distinguished Philatelists
Living people
Philately of Luxembourg
Year of birth missing (living people)
Philatelists